Loricula bipunctata is a species of minute bladder bug in the family Microphysidae. It is found in Europe and Northern Asia (excluding China) and North America.

References

Further reading

 
 
 

Articles created by Qbugbot
Insects described in 1857
Microphysidae